The Lugano Prealps (Prealpi Luganesi or Prealpi Lombarde Occidentali in Italian) are a mountain range in the western part of the Alps. They are located in Canton Ticino (southern Switzerland) and in Lombardy (northern Italy).

Geography
Administratively the Italian part of the range belongs to the provinces of Como and Varese, while the Swiss one is divided between the districts of Bellinzona, Locarno, Lugano and Mendrisio.

The western slopes of the mountains are drained by the Ticino River, the eastern ones by Adda and the southern-central part of them by Lambro, Olona and other minor rivers and streams, all of them directly or indirectly tributaries of the Po.

SOIUSA classification
According to SOIUSA (International Standardized Mountain Subdivision of the Alps) the mountain range is an Alpine section, classified in the following way:
 main part = Western Alps
 major sector = North Western Alps
 section = Lugano Prealps
 code = I/B-11

Borders
Lugano Prealps' borders are (clockwise):
 Lago Maggiore (west),
 Ticino River from Locarno to Bellinzona, San Jorio Pass (2.010 m, which connects them with the Lepontine Alps) and San Jorio valley till to Gravedona (north);
 Como lake (east);
 Po Plain (south).

Subdivision
The Lugano Prealps are divided into two subsections:
 Como Prealps - SOIUSA code:I/B-11.I
 Varese Prealps - SOIUSA code:I/B-11.II,
which are separated by the Monte Ceneri Pass.

These subsections are further divided in supergroups:
 Como Prealps:
 supergroup catena Gino-Camoghè-Fiorina - SOIUSA code:I/B-11.I-A
 supergroup catena Tremezzo-Generoso-Gordona - SOIUSA code:I/B-11.I-B
 supergroup catena del Triangolo Lariano - SOIUSA code:I/B-11.I-B
 Varese Prealps:
 supergroup catena Tamaro-Gambarogno-Lema - SOIUSA code:I/B-11.II-A,
 supergroup catena Piambello-Campo dei Fiori-Nudo - SOIUSA code:I/B-11.II-B.

Summits

The chief summits of the range are:

References

Maps
 Italian official cartography (Istituto Geografico Militare - IGM); on-line version: www.pcn.minambiente.it
 Swiss official cartography (Swiss Federal Office of Topography - Swisstopo); on-line version: map.geo.admin.ch

 
Mountain ranges of the Alps
Mountain ranges of Lombardy
Mountain ranges of Switzerland
Province of Varese
Province of Como
Landforms of Ticino
Italy–Switzerland border